Blue Heaven is a British television sitcom that starred Frank Skinner, Conleth Hill, John Forgeham, Nadim Sawalha and Paula Wilcox. It featured guest stars such as Bill Bailey, Bob Goody, Tamsin Greig, Lucy Davis, Beryl Reid, Philip Glenister and John Thomson.

It first appeared on Channel 4 as a one-off pilot in the series Bunch of Five in 1992, and was followed by one series of six episodes in 1994. It was described by Skinner as "a love-letter to the Black Country".

4 On Demand
In 2012 the series was made available free to viewers as part of Channel 4's 4 On Demand website.

References

External links

1992 British television series debuts
1994 British television series endings
1990s British sitcoms
Channel 4 sitcoms
British comedy television shows
English-language television shows